The Reuben Sale House, at 3700 Smith Lane in Oldham County, Kentucky near La Grange, was built around 1833.  It was listed on the National Register of Historic Places in 1982.

It is a two-story, single-pile brick house with four bays and Flemish bond brickwork on its front facade.  A " fine double-crib log barn" is a second contributing building.

References

Houses on the National Register of Historic Places in Kentucky
National Register of Historic Places in Oldham County, Kentucky
1833 establishments in Kentucky
Houses in Oldham County, Kentucky
Houses completed in 1833